The Bougainville Football Federation is the governing body of association football in the Autonomous Region of Bougainville, a self-governing territory of Papua New Guinea. It is currently a member of the Papua New Guinea Football Association. As of June 2022 the president of the federation is Justin Helele. The federation organizes all official footballing competitions in Bougainville.

History
The Bougainville Football Federation as a regional body has existed since at least the 1970s and has had a troubled relationship with the national governing body for decades. In 1973 the president of the association questioned the lack of Bougainvillean players on the Papua New Guinea national team and treatment of its clubs. 

In 2016 the BFF was one of several regional associations that broke away from the PNGFA and were suspended at the organization's Congress on December 28, 2016. The Bourgainville federation was reinstated as a member of the national association in August 2018.

For the 2019 season Bougainvillean club Chebu AROB F.C. joined the Papua New Guinea National Soccer League with the express purpose of "promoting and showcasing the quality of football in the region."

The Autonomous Region of Bougainville is set to gain independence from Papua New Guinea and become a fully sovereign nation by 2027. In 2022, the president of the Bougainville Football Federation expressed the association's desire to join FIFA and, presumably, the OFC. The federation and the governing bodies have already begun working together on footballing projects in the territory.

References

External links
Official website

Autonomous Region of Bougainville
Football in Papua New Guinea